Brian Ginsberg (born 1966) is an American former gymnast. He is a two-time US junior national gymnastics champion.  He also won gold medals at both the 1983 Pan American Games and the 1987 Pan American Games while competing on Team USA.

Early life

Ginsberg was born in Miami, Florida, to Nathan (a radiologist) and Iris Ginsberg, is Jewish, and grew up in Denver, Colorado, and Mobile, Alabama. His grandparents are Betty and Sam Diemar.

Gymnastics career
Ginsberg was the 1982 and 1983 US junior national gymnastics champion. In 1985 he won the all-around competition in the Brazil Cup. Ginsberg also won gold in the rings, silver in the floor exercise, and bronze in the vault individual medals at the National Sports Festival. He competed in the 1985 Maccabiah Games for Team USA.

Ginsberg competed in gymnastics for UCLA, where he majored in kinesiology and was pre-med hoping to specialize in sports medicine.

In 1986 competing for the UCLA Bruins, Ginsberg was an All-American, and finished second in the 1986 NCAA all-around competition. He won the floor exercise in the competition.

In 1987, Ginsberg won the McDonald's American Cup at George Mason University's Patriot Center in Virginia, as Soviet national champion Vladimir Gogoladze came in second. The Alabama State Senate passed a resolution commending him for extraordinary achievement.

Ginsberg won gold medals at both the 1983 Pan American Games and the 1987 Pan American Games (when he also won a silver medal) while competing on Team USA.

References 

Living people
Jewish gymnasts
Sportspeople from Miami
Sportspeople from Mobile, Alabama
Maccabiah Games competitors for the United States
UCLA Bruins men's gymnasts
Pan American Games gold medalists for the United States
1966 births
Jewish American sportspeople
Sportspeople from Denver
Competitors at the 1985 Maccabiah Games
Maccabiah Games gymnasts
Pan American Games medalists in gymnastics
Pan American Games silver medalists for the United States
Gymnasts at the 1983 Pan American Games
Gymnasts at the 1987 Pan American Games
Medalists at the 1987 Pan American Games
21st-century American Jews